Sabaya is a small town in the Bolivian Oruro Department. In 2001 it had a population of 573 inhabitants in 2001. Sabaya is the administrative center of the Sabaya Province and the Sabaya Municipality alike.

See also 
 Chipaya
 Jinchupalla

References 

Populated places in Oruro Department